Delisle or De Lisle or de Lisle may refer to:

People
Delisle (surname)
DeLisle Worrell, a former governor of the Central Bank of Barbados

Places
Canada

Delisle, Quebec, a former municipality that is now part of Alma, in RCM of Lac-Saint-Jean-Est, in administrative region of Saguenay-Lac-Saint-Jean, in Quebec
 Richmond Gulf (French: Lac Guillaume-Delisle), a waterbody in Nunavik, in administrative region of Nord-du-Québec, in Quebec, Canada
 Sector Delisle, a sector of Alma, Quebec, in Lac-Saint-Jean-Est Regional County Municipality, in administrative region of Saguenay-Lac-Saint-Jean, in Quebec
 Delisle, Saskatchewan, a town in Saskatchewan

United States
DeLisle, Mississippi, a census-designated place
Delisle, Ohio, an unincorporated community

The Moon
Mons Delisle, a mountain on the moon
Delisle (crater), a lunar crater

Other uses
Delisle scale, a temperature scale
De Lisle carbine, a World War II silent rifle
De Lisle College, a Roman Catholic school in Leicestershire, England
 De Lisle (novel), an 1828 novel by Elizabeth Caroline Grey

See also
Lisle (disambiguation)